Agios Isidoros is a village in the Paphos District of Cyprus, located 6 km southeast of Polis Chrysochous.

References

Communities in Paphos District